The 2011 ASP World Tour was a professional competitive surfing league run by the Association of Surfing Professionals. Men and women competed in separate tours with events taking place from late February to mid-December, at various surfing locations around the world.

Surfers received points for their best events. The surfer with the most points at the end of the tour was announced the 2011 ASP surfing World Champion.

Men's World Tour

Tournaments

Source

Final Standings
Source

Women's World Tour

Tournaments

Source

Final Standings
Source

External links
 Official Site

World Surf League
ASP World Tour